Bourguignon can refer to:

 Bourguignon (surname)
 Burgundian language (Oïl), an Oïl language spoken in the region of Burgundy
 Bourguignon, Doubs, a commune of the Doubs département of France
 a style of cooking with alcohol, especially Beef bourguignon
 Bourguignon (grape), another name for the French wine grape Gouais blanc
 Bourguignon horse, an extinct horse breed
 Jacques Courtois, a painter who was popularly known as "le Bourguignon"
 Fort Bourguignon, a fortress in Pula, Croatia
 Bourguignons, Aube, a commune in France